The Caroni Swamp is the second largest mangrove wetland in Trinidad and Tobago. It is located on the west coast of Trinidad, south of Port of Spain and northwest of Chaguanas, where the Caroni River meets the Gulf of Paria.

The Caroni Swamp is an estuarine system comprising 5,611 hectares of mangrove forest and herbaceous marsh, interrupted by numerous channels, and brackish and saline lagoons, and with extensive intertidal mudflats on the seaward side. This  swamp is an important wetland since it is ecologically diverse, consisting of marshes, mangrove swamp and tidal mudflats in close proximity. The wetland provides a variety of habitats for flora and faunal species and as such, supports a rich biodiversity.  It is highly productive system that provides food and protection and is a nursery for marine and freshwater species.

Description
The Caroni Swamp is a 12,000 acre swamp  located on the west coast of the island of Trinidad.  It is one of the largest mangrove forest on the island.  Caroni Swamp is protected under the Ramsar Convention as a wetland of international importance.  The Caroni Swamp runs along the banks of the Caroni River and contains numerous channels, brackish and saline lagoons with intertidal mudflats.  The Caroni Swamp also contains fresh water and saltwater marshes and is also known as a bird sanctuary. The central section of the acreage is designated as a wildlife sanctuary and is the home of one of Trinidad and Tobago's national bird, the Scarlet Ibis.  The Caroni Swamp is the major roosting place for the Scarlet Ibis (Eudocimus ruber) and is also the home of over 100 avian species.

Protected Area and Species
The Caroni Swamp is protected under the Ramsar Convention.  The Ramsar Convention is the intergovernmental treaty that provides the framework for the conservation and wise use of wetlands and their resources .  It all started during the 1960s when people became concerned about the increasing loss and the degradation of wetland habitat for migratory birds.  The treaty was first adopted in the Iranian city of Ramsar in 1971.   The Ramsar Convention is the oldest intergovernmental environmental agreements which came into force in 1975.
The Caroni Swamp has a total of 20 endangered species and is ecologically diverse.  It provides a variety of habitats for flora and fauna.  Caroni Swamp supports a rich biodiversity.  It is a very productive area of wetland that provides food (organic production) and also provides protection.  It is also a nursery for marine and freshwater species.  Caroni Swamp is important economically and is a popular site for ecotourism.

Educational Usage / Eco-tourism
The Caroni Swamp is visited by thousands of eco-tourists per year.  This is important to local communities.  The Caroni Swamp is not only an attraction for tourism but it also provides goods and services to local communities and to the Island of Trinidad.  For example, the swamp provides coastal storm surge protection, carbon sequestration (the uptake and storage of carbon by trees and plants that absorb carbon dioxide), and sediment filtration for near-shore ecosystems.  In 2011 a project was started in order to evaluate the TEV, total economic value, of the Caroni Swamp.  The study looks at the way the Caroni Swamp provides for Trinidad and Tobago and to the wider Caribbean. The study will also predict the potential damage that climate change can have on wetlands and ecosystems such as the Caroni Swamp.  This study could provide strategies for preventing damage to other wetlands as well.

Scarlet Ibis 
The Caroni Swamp is also a wonderful site for bird watching.  It is home to over 100 bird species (my Tobago.info). In 1962 when Trinidad and Tobago gained independence from Great Britain, the Scarlet Ibis was chosen as the national bird of Trinidad.  The Scarlet Ibis then gained protection and could no longer be hunted.  The Scarlet Ibis (Eudocimus ruber), travels to Venezuela every day from the Caroni Swamp.  The distance between the swamp and the mainland of Venezuela is about 11 miles (mytobagoinfo). During the evening, the Scarlet Ibis returns to the Swamp where it roosts in the mangrove trees (destination tnt). Watching the Scarlet Ibis return from feeding on the mainland of Venezuela is the main attraction for many tourists (mytobagoinfo). Their vibrant red feathers fill the sky as they return to the swamp (gotrinidadandtobago).  The Scarlet Ibis’ bright red colour comes from the pigments from their food.  Their diet consists of crustaceans, crabs small fish, mollusks, worms, and insects (aqua.org). The Scarlet Ibis is protected in Trinidad and Tobago but is at risk from poaching and pollution of the Swamp.

Caroni Bird Sanctuary Tours 
The Nanan's Bird Sanctuary Tours started in the 1930s and is named after Winston Nanan.  Winston Nanan of Trinidad, was an acknowledged expert on the flora and fauna of the Caroni Swamp Bird Sanctuary.  He helped get a petition signed along with his father to make the Swamp a bird sanctuary. Nanan's Caroni Bird Sanctuary tours conduct lectured boat tours daily into the Caroni Swamp by trained guides.  The tours include specialized bird watching tours, fishing tours, water sampling trips, educational and research trips, photography and filming trips, and also destination weddings at the Caroni Swamp.

Caroni Swamp Today 
The Caroni Swamp still remains a popular tourist destination in Trinidad.  Many tourists enjoy taking Nanan's tour guides to the Swamp.  Climate change and pollution to the swamp is becoming a main concern as Trinidad and Tobago tries to conserve Caroni Swamp.  Illegal hunting and harvesting of oysters as well as harvesting of mangrove bark seem to be a few of the problems for the Caroni Swamp.  The government of Trinidad is trying to keep the Swamp conserved knowing that it not only provides for the flora and fauna but for humans as well.

Wildlife highlights

References

External links
 Video overview

Wetlands of Trinidad and Tobago
Swamps of North America
Swamps of South America
Trinidad (island)
Mangrove ecoregions
Natural history of Trinidad and Tobago
Ramsar sites in Trinidad and Tobago